Jorge Humberto Rodríguez Alvárez (born 20 May 1971 in San Alejo, El Salvador) is a Salvadoran former professional footballer and currently manager.

He was one of the mainstays of the El Salvador national football team during the second half of the 1990s.

Club career
Nicknamed El Zarco, Rodríguez started his career with Salvadoran Second Division outfit Huracán and has played professionally for Primera División de Fútbol de El Salvador sides Isidro Metapán, FAS, Águila and Alianza as well as for Dallas Burn (now FC Dallas) of Major League Soccer.

In his six seasons with the Dallas Burn, Rodríguez appeared in 155 matches, scoring 25 goals.

International career
Rodríguez made his debut for El Salvador in an April 1991 UNCAF Nations Cup qualification against Nicaragua and has earned over a period of 14 years a total of 71 caps, scoring 9 goals. He has represented his country in 24 FIFA World Cup qualification matches and played at the 1991, 1995 and 2001 UNCAF Nations Cups as well as at the 1996, 1998 and 2002 CONCACAF Gold Cups.

His final international game was a November 2004 FIFA World Cup qualification match against Panama.

International goals
Scores and results list El Salvador's goal tally first.

Personal life
The nickname El Zarco comes from the Spanish word for light blue, and refers to the color of his eyes.

Honours

Club honours

As a player
 FAS
Primera División de Fútbol de El Salvador (La Primera) (2): 1994–95, 1995–96
 Águila
La Primera (2): 2000 Apertura, Clausura 2001
Copa Presidente (1): 2000
 Metapán
La Primera (2): Clausura 2007, Apertura 2008
 Dallas Burn:
U.S. Open Cup (1): 1997

As a coach
 Metapán
La Primera (3): Apertura 2013, Clausura 2014, Apertura 2014
 Alianza
La Primera (2): Apertura 2017, Clausura 2018

Professional awards and achievements
 Dallas Burn MVP (1998)
 Dallas Burn Defender of the year (1998)
 Dallas Burn Defender of the year (2000)
 Dallas Burn Defender of the year (2001)

References

External links
 
 Profile – CD FAS 
 Interview with Zarco after retiring – La Prensa Gráfica 

1971 births
Living people
People from La Unión Department
Association football midfielders
Salvadoran footballers
El Salvador international footballers
1996 CONCACAF Gold Cup players
1998 CONCACAF Gold Cup players
2001 UNCAF Nations Cup players
2002 CONCACAF Gold Cup players
A.D. Isidro Metapán footballers
C.D. FAS footballers
FC Dallas players
C.D. Águila footballers
Alianza F.C. footballers
Salvadoran expatriate footballers
Expatriate soccer players in the United States
Salvadoran expatriate sportspeople in the United States
Major League Soccer players
El Salvador national football team managers
Salvadoran football managers